Schmittmann is a German surname. Notable people with this name include:
Beate Schmittmann, German-American physicist
 (1872–1939), German social scientist
 (1880–1970), German political activist
 (1878–1956), German jurist, first president of the German Federal Fiscal Court
Stefan Schmittmann (born 1956), German bank manager